Anne Sofie Hjort (born 5 July 1992) is a former Danish handball player who last played for Randers HK.

References

1992 births
Living people
People from Herning Municipality
Danish female handball players
Sportspeople from the Central Denmark Region
21st-century Danish women